Rajaldesar railway station is a railway station in Churu district, Rajasthan. Its code is RJR. It serves Rajaldesar town. The station consists of 2 platforms. Passenger, Express, and Superfast trains halt here.

Trains

The following trains halt at Rajaldesar railway station in both directions:

 Bikaner–Delhi Sarai Rohilla Superfast Express
 Howrah–Jaisalmer Superfast Express
 Bikaner–Delhi Sarai Rohilla Intercity Express

References

Railway stations in Churu district
Bikaner railway division